The 2022–23 Philippine Basketball Association (PBA) Commissioner's Cup Finals was the best-of-7 championship series of the 2022–23 PBA Commissioner's Cup, and the conclusion of the conference's playoffs. The Barangay Ginebra San Miguel and guest team Bay Area Dragons competed for the 20th Commissioner's Cup championship and the 132nd overall championship contested by the league.

The Bay Area Dragons are the first guest team since 1980 to appear in the PBA Finals, while this is the second time in the past three Commissioner's Cup tournaments that Barangay Ginebra appeared in a Commissioner's Cup Finals; they previously won the title in 2018 where they defeated the San Miguel Beermen in six games. Barangay Ginebra defeated Bay Area in seven games to claim their third Commissioner's Cup title in franchise history. Christian Standhardinger was named the Finals MVP for this series.

Background

Road to the finals

Head-to-head matchup

Series summary

Game summaries

Game 1

Game 2

Game 3

Game 4
Prior to the game, Barangay Ginebra's Scottie Thompson was awarded his second Best Player of the Conference award, and Barangay Ginebra import and Thompson's teammate Justin Brownlee was awarded the Best Import of the Conference award for the third time.

Game 5

Game 6
A day before the game, Bay Area's second import Myles Powell was reactivated in lieu of Andrew Nicholson who missed both games 4 and 5 due to an injury sustained during game 3.

Game 7
The game was initially scheduled on January 13, 2023, but was moved to January 15 due to 'popular demand'.

On January 12, long-time Barangay Ginebra import Justin Brownlee became a naturalized Filipino citizen.

The game set the highest attendance ever in a PBA finals game with 54,589.

Rosters

{| class="toccolours" style="font-size: 95%; width: 100%;"
|-
! colspan="2" style="background-color: #; color: #; text-align: center;" | Barangay Ginebra San Miguel 2022–23 PBA Commissioner's Cup roster
|- style="background-color:#; color: #; text-align: center;"
! Players !! Coaches
|-
| valign="top" |
{| class="sortable" style="background:transparent; margin:0px; width:100%;"
! Pos. !! # !! POB !! Name !! Height !! Weight !! DOB (YYYY–MM–DD) !! College 
|-

  Also serves as Barangay Ginebra's board governor.
{| class="toccolours" style="font-size: 95%; width: 100%;"
|-
! colspan="2" style="background-color: #; color: #; text-align: center;" | Bay Area Dragons 2022–23 PBA Commissioner's Cup roster
|- style="background-color:#; color: #; text-align: center;"
! Players !! Coaches
|-
| valign="top" |
{| class="sortable" style="background:transparent; margin:0px; width:100%;"
! Pos. !! # !! Nat. !! Name !! Height !! Weight !! DOB (YYYY–MM–DD)
|-

Broadcast notes
The Commissioner Cup Finals was aired on TV5 & One Sports with simulcast on PBA Rush, SMART Sports on Facebook, SMART GigaPlay App, and Radyo5 92.3 News FM (both in standard and high definition).

The PBA Rush broadcast provided English language coverage of the Finals.

The SMART Sports Facebook broadcast provided English-Filipino language coverage of the Finals.

Additional Game 7 crew:
Trophy presentation: Jutt Sulit
Celebration interviewer: Bea Escudero and Belle Gregorio

Notes

References

External links
PBA official website

2023
2022–23 PBA season
PBA Commissioner's Cup Finals
PBA Commissioner's Cup Finals
Barangay Ginebra San Miguel games